The Rivergreenway is the backbone of burgeoning Fort Wayne Trails network in Fort Wayne, Indiana and the surrounding area.  The Rivergreenway consists of nearly 25-miles of connected trails through a linear park following alongside or near the City's three rivers:  St. Joseph River, St. Marys River, and Maumee River.  In 2009, the Rivergreenway was designated as a National Recreation Trail. The trail network also connects to the Wabash & Erie Canal Towpath Trail.  In 2011, the Wabash & Erie Canal Towpath Trail was completed, the Greater Fort Wayne has 50 miles of connected trails.

The Rivergreenway originates at the confluence of the three rivers meet in downtown Fort Wayne at the water filtration plant.  This is considered the zero-mile marker for the St. Joseph, St. Marys and Maumee Pathways.

The St. Joseph Pathway (3.4 miles) follows the west side of the St. Joseph River from the confluence to Indiana University – Purdue University Fort Wayne (IPFW).  This trail is currently being extended from Johnny Appleseed Park to Shoaff Park.  The first phase of construction from Johnny Appleseed to IPFW was complete in the summer of 2010 and includes a new trail across the Coliseum Blvd Bridge and the trail also goes under the bridge to connect with IPFW.
The St. Joe Blvd Pathway (1.14 miles) follows the east side of the St. Joseph River from State Blvd to Lafayette Street.  This section of trail was built as part of a flood control project.
The St. Marys Pathway (8.75 miles) runs south from the confluence to Tillman Park where it connects with the Southtown Centre Trail.  Along the way, the St. Marys Pathway connects with multiple city parks including the Historic Old Fort, Lawton, Headwaters, Bloomingdale, Swinney, Foster and Tillman.  This pathways is also the main trail connection to downtown Fort Wayne.
The Maumee Pathway (8.75 miles) cuts east on the north side of the Maumee River winding its way to the City of New Haven's Moser Park where it terminates.  This section of trail is the most remote section because it is located behind the City's treatment ponds.  In 2009, the City built a trail spur to Coliseum Blvd in order to provide emergency access and another point of entry for trail users.
The Yarnell Trail (1.11 miles) originates in West Swinney Park at the St. Marys Pathway just southeast of the swimming pool and runs west through West Swinney Park, along West Jefferson Boulevard to Rockhill Park.
The Southtown Centre Trail (.60 miles) begins at Tillman Park, where the St. Marys Pathway ends, and it runs south along Hanna St. to a mid-block crossing, taking trail users across a field to the back side of Southtown Centre.  By 2017, this trail had connected to Anthony Boulevard.

References

External links
Fort Wayne Parks Rivergreenway

Geography of Fort Wayne, Indiana
Hiking trails in Indiana
Tourist attractions in Fort Wayne, Indiana
Transportation in Allen County, Indiana
Protected areas of Allen County, Indiana
Transportation in Fort Wayne, Indiana
National Recreation Trails in Indiana